Regions Plaza is a 24-floor office high-rise located at 1180 West Peachtree Street in Atlanta, Georgia. The building was completed in 2001 and renovated in 2014. The building currently serves as the Georgia headquarters for Regions Financial Corporation.

The building is located on the corner of 14th Street and West Peachtree Street which is the latitude line that defines the center of Midtown. Its parking garage entrance is located at 1217 Spring Street.

Prior to 2013, the building was known as Atlantic Center Plaza.

Tenants
 Regions Financial Corporation
 Holland & Knight LLP
 Salesloft
 Taipei Economic and Cultural Office in Atlanta

References

External links
 www.regionsplaza.com

Skyscraper office buildings in Atlanta
Midtown Atlanta
Office buildings completed in 2001
Regions Financial Corporation